Environmental studies (EVS or EVST) is a multidisciplinary academic field which systematically studies human interaction with the environment. Environmental studies connects principles from the physical sciences, commerce/economics, the humanities, and social sciences to address complex contemporary environmental issues. It is a broad field of study that includes the natural environment, the built environment, and the relationship between them. The field encompasses study in basic principles of ecology and environmental science, as well as associated subjects such as ethics, geography, anthropology, policy, education, politics, urban planning, law, economics, philosophy, sociology and social justice, planning, pollution control and natural resource management. There are many Environmental Studies degree programs, including a Master's degree and a Bachelor's degree. Environmental Studies degree programs provide a wide range of skills and analytical tools needed to face the environmental issues of our world head on.  Students in Environmental Studies gain the intellectual and methodological tools to understand and address the crucial environmental issues of our time and the impact of individuals, society, and the planet. Environmental education's main goal is to instill in all members of society a pro-environmental thinking and attitude. This will help to create environmental ethics and raise people's awareness of the importance of environmental protection and biodiversity.

History
The New York State College of Forestry at Syracuse University established a BS in environmental studies degree in the 1950s, awarding its first degree in 1956. Middlebury College established the major there in 1965.

The Environmental Studies Association of Canada (ESAC) was established in 1993 "to further research and teaching activities in areas related to environmental studies in Canada". ESAC was officially integrated in 1994, and the first convention for ESAC was held at the Learned Societies Conference in Calgary the same year. ESAC's magazine, A\J: Alternatives Journal was first published by Robert A. Paehlke on 4 July 1971.

In 2008, The Association for Environmental Studies and Sciences (AESS) was founded as the first professional association in the interdisciplinary field of environmental studies in the United States. The AESS is also the publisher for the Journal of Environmental Studies and Sciences (JESS), which aims to allow researchers in various disciplinarians related to environmental sciences to have base for researchers to use and publish new information related to environmental studies. In 2010, the National Council for Science and the Environment (NCSE) agreed to advise and support the association. In March of 2011, The association's scholarly journal, the Journal of Environmental Studies and Sciences (JESS), commenced publication.

Environmental Studies in U.S. Universities

In the United States, many high school students are able to take environmental science as a college-level course. Over 500 colleges and universities in the United States offer environmental studies as a degree. The University of California, Berkeley has awarded the most degrees in environmental studies for U.S. universities, with 409 degrees awarded in 2019. The universities in the United States that have the highest percentage of degrees awarded is Antioch University-New England, where nearly 35% of degrees awarded in 2019 were in environmental studies.

Education 

Worldwide, programs in environmental studies may be offered through colleges of liberal arts, life science, social science or agriculture. Students of environmental studies use what they learn from the sciences, social sciences, and humanities to better understand environmental problems and potentially offer solutions to them. Students look at how we interact with the natural world and come up with ideas to prevent its destruction. 

In the 1960s, the word "environment" became one of the most commonly used in educational discourse in the United Kingdom. Educationists were becoming increasingly worried about the influence of the environment on children as well as the school's usage of the environment. The attempt to define the field of environmental studies has resulted in a discussion over its role in the curriculum. The use of the environment is one of the teaching approaches used in today's schools to carry on the legacy of educational philosophy known as 'Progressive education' or 'New education' in the first part of the twentieth century. The primary goal of environmental studies is to assist children in understanding the processes that influence their surroundings so that they do not stay a passive, and often befuddled, observer of the environment, but rather become knowledgeable active mediators of it. The study of the environment can be considered to offer unique chances for the development and exercise of the general cognitive skills that Piaget's work has made educators aware of. Environmental studies are increasingly being viewed as a long-term preparation for higher environmental studies such as Sociology, Archaeology, or Historical Geography.

See also

 Conservation Commons
 Environmental ethics
 Environmental communication
 Environmental education
 Environmental racism
 Environmental social science
 Environmental sociology
 Environmental geography
 List of environmental degrees
 List of environmental journals
 Sustainable development

References

Further reading 
Emmett, Rob, and Frank Zelko (eds.), “Minding the Gap: Working Across Disciplines in Environmental Studies,” RCC Perspectives 2014, no. 2. doi.org/10.5282/rcc/6313.

External links
 Association for Environmental Studies and Sciences
 Environmental Studies Association of Canada
 Journal of Environmental Studies and Sciences

 
Academic disciplines